The Politics of Genocide may refer to:
Edward S. Herman#The Politics of Genocide
Randolph L. Braham#Selected works